Cernișoara is a commune located in Vâlcea County, Oltenia, Romania. It is composed of seven villages: Armășești (the commune centre), Cernișoara, Groși, Mădulari, Modoia, Obârșia and Sărsănești.

References

Communes in Vâlcea County
Localities in Oltenia